Penfold may refer to:
Penfold (pillar box), a type of pillar box designed by John Penfold

People
Penfold (surname)

Other
Ernest Penfold, character from the animated series Danger Mouse
Penfolds, Australian wine label
Penfolds Grange, Australian wine produced by that label
Penfold Golf, British manufacturer of golf balls
Penfold Park (also called Penfold Garden), public park in Sha Tin, Hong Kong
Penfold PGA Championship, annual professional golf tournament
Penfold Tournament, former professional golf tournament (1932–1974)